Origgio is a comune (municipality) in the Province of Varese in the Italian region Lombardy, located about  northwest of Milan and about  southeast of Varese.

The municipality of Origgio contains the frazioni (subdivisions, mainly villages and hamlets) Cascina Muschiona and Cascina Broggio.

Origgio borders the following municipalities: Caronno Pertusella, Cerro Maggiore, Lainate, Nerviano, Saronno, Uboldo.

Demographic evolution

References

External links
 www.comune.origgio.va.it
 Google Maps

Cities and towns in Lombardy